Madrigal District is one of twenty districts of the province Caylloma in Peru.

Geography 
The Ch'ila mountain range traverses the district. One of the highest mountains of the district is Suriwiri. Other mountains are listed below:

 Hatun Pila
 Jichu Qullu
 Parwayani
 Sillani
 Suriwiri

Madrigal lies north of the Colca valley.

Ethnic groups 
The people in the district are mainly indigenous citizens of Quechua descent. Quechua is the language which the majority of the population (56.78%) learnt to speak in childhood, 42.92% of the residents started speaking using the Spanish language (2007 Peru Census).

References

Districts of the Caylloma Province
Districts of the Arequipa Region